Congalton is a surname of Scottish origin. Notable people with the surname include:

Bunk Congalton (1875–1937), Canadian baseball player
James de Congalton Hepburn (1878–1955), Canadian politician
Jimmy Congalton (1879–1947), Canadian curler
Samuel Congalton (1796–1850), Scottish sailor

References

Surnames of Scottish origin